Milan–Saronno railway is a railway line in Lombardy, Italy.

History 
The line was opened by the FMSME (later: Ferrovie Nord Milano) on 25 March 1879.

The line was completely revamped during the 90's of the 20th century, building four tracks and new metro-type stations.

The line is fully integrated in the Milan suburban railway network, with two standard services with Central Milan and the Milan passerby railway, while regional services with Novara, Malpensa, Varese and Como run directly between Milan and Saronno.

See also 
 List of railway lines in Italy

References 

 Ferrovienord - Prospetto informativo della rete

External links 

Railway lines in Lombardy
Railway lines opened in 1879
1879 establishments in Italy